The World Scrabble Championship (WSC) is the most-prestigious title in competitive English-language Scrabble. It was held in every odd year from 1991 to 2013. From the 2013 edition, it became an annual event. It has been an open event since 2014. Although the official brand name and organizations of the event have changed over the years, many Scrabble enthusiasts from more than 30 countries compete to become World Scrabble Champion.

The reigning World Scrabble Champion is Nigel Richards from New Zealand, who won his record fifth title at the 2019 Mattel World Scrabble Championships by winning the final in Torquay, United Kingdom.

History
Sponsorship of the World Scrabble Championship (WSC) formerly alternated between Hasbro and Mattel, the North American and global owners of the Scrabble trademark, respectively. However, after Hasbro declined to sponsor WSC 2005, Mattel has organized and sponsored all championships. Mind Sports International (MSI) began sponsoring the event in 2013 after successfully organizing their own major Scrabble tournament in Prague in 2012. As of 2018, it is now sponsored by Mindsports Academy.

The number of players competing in the tournament has risen steadily over time, from 48 in 1991 to 108 in 2009. Each country is allocated seats for the championship, and individual countries' national associations determine which of their players represent them. This is typically done by means of a national rating system or qualifier tournaments. A good performance by a national team according to specific criteria will earn further permanent places for that country.

The official dictionary, used in the majority of English-language Scrabble-playing countries and colloquially known as SOWPODS (an anagram of OSPD and OSW), was used until 2007. It is a combination of two dictionaries: OSPD (Official Scrabble Players Dictionary), published in the US, and OSW (Official Scrabble Words), published in the UK. Local tournaments used only their respective dictionary for the tournament, and each contains words chiefly used and spelled in US English and UK English. Since 2007, Collins supplies the only dictionary used in the WSC, Collins Scrabble Words, which is published in the UK. It was updated on 21 May 2015, before later being approved by the World English-Language Scrabble Players Association (WESPA) for tournaments on 1 September.

On May 17, 2013, Mattel announced that the event would be renamed the Scrabble Champions Tournament, and the tournament would be held annually as part of Mind Sports International's Prague Mind Sports Festival. MSI introduced a 'Last Chance Qualifier' tournament, giving players a last opportunity to qualify for 5 places in the main event if they failed to achieve a place on their national team. A four-way knockout stage was introduced for the top four finishers, which consisted of a best-of-3 semi-final followed by a best-of-5 final. Nigel Richards became World Champion here, making him the first player to defend his world title.

In 2014 the Scrabble Champions Tournament continued in London, but it became an open event, with all players invited to compete. A quarter-final stage was added, meaning that the top 8 progressed to the knockout stages. Craig Beevers won the event, making him the first British World Scrabble Champion since Mark Nyman in 1993.

In 2015, following cancellation of the SCT, Mattel and MSI agreed to allow WESPA to organize their own traditional unofficial World Championship, branded the WESPA Championship (WESPAC). It was held in Perth, Australia and followed the invitational format of pre-MSI WSC events. 130 players qualified to play. Wellington Jighere of Nigeria emerged as WESPA Champion after beating Lewis Mackay 4–0 in the final.

In 2016, the tournament was renamed the "MSI World Championships"  and was split into two divisions based on players' rankings. MSI also hosted world championships in other languages, including French, German, Spanish and Catalan, alongside the French Duplicate Championship.

The 2017 MSI World Championships were to be held in Doha, Qatar in August 2017, but on 13 June it was announced that the tournament was to be relocated to Nottingham, United Kingdom. It followed the same format as the 2016 event. This was won by Australian David Eldar. The second WESPA Championships (first held in 2015) were held in Nairobi, Kenya in November and were won by Akshay Bhandarkar.

The 2018 event, renamed again the Mattel World Scrabble Championships, was organised by Mindsports Academy. The main event was held in Torquay, Devon, but the best-of-5 final was held in London to celebrate the game's 70th anniversary. The event was won by Nigel Richards, who went on to defend his title (and win his fifth championship) the following year against David Eldar at the Riviera International Centre in Torquay.

List of finals

See also
Brand's Crossword Game King's Cup
Canadian Scrabble Championship
List of world championships in mind sports
Scrabble Players Championship
National School Scrabble Championship (North America)
Scrabble
World Youth Scrabble Championships

References

External links
WSC official website

 
Recurring events established in 1991
Biennial events